Arpana Caur is an Indian contemporary painter and graphic artist.

Early life and education 
Arpana Caur  was born in 1954, in Delhi. She comes from a Sikh family who fled the Pakistani West Punjab to the Republic of India in 1947 during the confusion over the partition of British India. Her mother Ajit Kaur (born in 1934), is a writer who writes in Panjabi. She has not had her first name Arpana since her birth, but she adopted it at the age of fifteen, as an expression of a personal development process.

Her exposure to art, music and literature happened early in her life. She learnt the Sitar, wrote poetry, but enjoyed painting the most. At the age of nine, she made her first oil painting, 'Mother & Daughter' inspired by the works of Amrita Shergil. 
Arpana graduated from the University of Delhi with a Master of Arts degree in literature. She never received formal training in painting, and was largely self taught. She proceeded to receive training in the etching technique at the Garhi Studios in New Delhi, completing it in 1982.

In an interview with Yashodhara Dalmia, when asked if she called herself a 'feminist', Caur immediately replied with a resounding 'no' because the themes she incorporates or is curious about, go beyond gender and ones that every human is faced with.

Career

Influences and style 
Arpana Caur's paintings were shaped by the events and situations around her. Her works very much focus on social issues that highlight the victimized. In addition, there is a clear influence of existing traditions in her works, namely drawing from the Gond, Gondna, Madhubani, miniature and folk art forms.  Her mother's strong influence on her extended into her works; where the 'woman' often occupies a central focus. Her works are also inspired by Pahari miniatures (hill-paintings), Punjabi literature, and Indian folk art.

One will notice that Caur's works encompass paintings with watercolour, gauche and sculptures that are layered with motifs, myths and stories that the artist purposefully references. It is important to point out that she used the 'scissors' motif so often that it earned her the pet name kainchi.

'Spirituality', and 'Time' are recurring themes in her works. In conduction with that, she is also intrigued by the themes of 'Life' and 'Death'. Nature and figures play a vital role in the stories she tells through her works.

In the 1990s, Caur created a series of collaborations with Indian folk artists from the indigenous ethnic groups of Warli and Godna, who lived in the Madhubani region of the Indian state of Bihar. She is one of the first contemporary artists to have collaborated with folk artisans.

In 1995, she was commissioned to do a large work 'Tears from Hiroshima' by the Hiroshima Museum of Modern Art to create a mural to mark the 50th anniversary of the bombings. This work was also shown at the Documenta at Kassel. Interestingly, the artist was afraid of the temporary aspect of this installation and decided to add in pots brimming with water signifying tears within the context of the man-made tragedy.

Solo exhibitions

Group exhibitions 
1995 Inside Out: Contemporary Women Artists of India, Middlesbrough Art Gallery

1992 Crossing Black Waters

1988 Graven Images

1988 Numaish Lait Kala

1984 First Indo- Greek Cultural Symposium and group shows, Athens and Delphi

1981 Executed two large murals for India International Trade Fair, New Delhi

Reviews, articles texts 
Eddie Chambers, 'Inside Out: Contemporary Women Artists of India', Art Monthly no193, (February1996) 35-37. Besides this, her work has been covered extensively in newspapers, magazines, art books and International Herald Tribune, Arts Review London, Citizen Ottawa, Die Welt and Dagens Nhyter Stockholm.

Caur has also been cinematically covered with numerous films and biopics by BBC London, Sidharth Tagore, Chandermani, Doordarshan and Raqs Media.

Awards and honours 
2011  Rotary Club of Delhi: The Lifetime Achievement Award for Vocational Excellence

2010  Sikh Art and Film Foundation, New York: The Lifetime Achievement Award

2009  Chief Guest for Conferring B.F.A. degrees, Delhi College of Art Convocation

2007 T.K. Padamini Award, Kerala Govt.

2001 Advisory Committee Member: National Gallery of Modern Art Delhi, Lalit Kala Academy, and Sahitya Kala Parishad

1995–98 Selection Committee member, Republic Day Pageants for Ministry of Defence, Govt. of India

1995 Commissioned by Hiroshima Museum to excite a large work for its permanent collection on the occasion of the 50th Anniversary of the Holocaust

1991–92 Purchase Committee Member, National Gallery of Modern Art, New Delhi

1990–2000 Collaborated with Gonna artist Sat Narain Pandey and for the first time in India, co-signed works with him

1990–02 Jury Member, Republic Day Pageants New Delhi Nominated Eminent Artist by Lalit Kala Academy

1989 Jury Member, National Exhibition, New Delhi

1987 VI Triennele Gold Medal for Painting (International exhibition)

1986 Gold Medal at 6th India Triennale (awarded by the Lalit Kala Akademi)

Commendation Certificate in Algiers Biennale

1985 All India Fine Arts Society Award 

1984 Research Grant from Lalit Kala Academy for painting in Garhi Studio, New Delhi

Collections 
Caur's paintings have been collected extensively in collections, both public and private, which include:

 Victoria and Albert Museum London
 Rockefeller Collection, New York
 Museum of Contemporary Art, Los Angeles
 Singapore Museum of Modern Art, Singapore
 National Gallery of Modern Art, New Delhi, Bangalore and Mumbai
 Government Museum and Art Gallery, Chandigarh
 Ethnographic Museum, Stockholm
 Kunst Museum, Düsseldorf
 Bradford Museum, Bradford, U.K
 Glenbarra Museum, Japan
 Deutsche Bank, Mumbai and Chandigarh
 Kapany Collection, San Francisco
 Asian Art Museum, San Francisco
 Jehangir Nicholson Art Foundation, Mumbai 
 Birla Akademi Collection, Calcutta
 Peabody Essex Museum, Boston
 Reubens Museum, New York
 Venkatappa Museum (Roerich & Hebbar), Bangalore
 Bharat Bhawan, Bhopal
 Bengal Foundation, Dhaka
 J.K Kejriwal Museum Collection, Bangalore Dhaka Museum

Social consciousness 
Arpana Caur has been leading the Academy of Fine Arts & Literature which hosts the South Asian Literature Festival; strengthening bonds between authors from the subcontinent.

She is known to have successfully rallied against the felling of trees in New Delhi's Siri forest area during the construction of food courts / restaurants for the 2010 Commonwealth Games Village.

She supports a leprosy home in Ghaziabad, setup in the memory of her younger sister. The home also offers vocational training for young girls.

Notes

References

External links 

 Profile on Google Arts & Culture

Living people
Year of birth missing (living people)
20th-century Indian painters
20th-century Indian women artists
21st-century Indian women artists
Indian contemporary painters
Indian women painters
Indian women contemporary artists
Women artists from Delhi